Shih-Hsien Yu is a mathematician at the National University of Singapore (NUS). He is known for his work on hyperbolic conservation laws and kinetic equations.

Biography 
Yu attended Taichung first senior high School. He did his undergraduate studies and master courses at National Taiwan University, followed by graduate studies at Stanford University, working under Tai-Ping Liu and obtaining his PhD in 1994. He was subsequently a postdoc fellow at University of Minnesota (1994–1995), faculty member at University of California, Los Angeles (1995–1999), Osaka University (1999–2000), City University of Hong Kong (2000–2007), before moving to the National University of Singapore in 2007.

Contributions 
With Tai-Ping Liu, Yu has solved several basic problems in conservation laws and kinetic equations such as the existence of discrete shock wave for Lax-Friedrichs scheme, and the positive-valued function property of the Boltzmann shock profile, pointwise structure of the Green’s functions for linearized Boltzmann equation, and invariant manifolds for stationary Boltzmann flows.

Selected works

Awards and honors 
Yu was an invited speaker at the International Congress of Mathematicians(ICM) in 2014 (Partial Differential Equations section).

References

External links 
 Homepage of Shih-Hsien Yu: http://www.math.nus.edu.sg/~matysh
 The Mathematics Genealogy Project – Shih-Hsien Yu: http://www.genealogy.ams.org/id.php?id=39222

1964 births
Living people
20th-century Taiwanese mathematicians
Academic staff of the National University of Singapore
National Taiwan University alumni
21st-century Taiwanese mathematicians